Prorhynchus is a genus of flatworms belonging to the family Prorhynchidae.

Species:
 Prorhynchus alpinus
 Prorhynchus fontinalis
 Prorhynchus hastatus

References

Platyhelminthes